Waimate District is a territorial authority district located in the Canterbury Region of the South Island of New Zealand. The main town is Waimate, while there are many smaller rural communities dispersed throughout the area. Its boundary to the south is the Waitaki River, to the west Lake Benmore and to the north-east the Pareora River.

The district is administered by the Waimate District Council and regionally by the Canterbury Regional Council. John Coles, who was first elected as a councillor in 1994, was mayor from 2004 to his retirement at the 2013 local elections.

The district is the only part of New Zealand where Bennett's wallabies are prolific, after their introduction from Australia in the 19th century. The animals are a mixed blessing locally, attracting tourists but being a farm pest, and culling measures have been taken in their slowly expanding territory.<ref>McNeilly, H. "Wallabies invade Richie McCaw country", stuff.co.nz, 30 October 2015. Retrieved 26 April 2016.</ref>

Demographics

Waimate District had a population of 7,815 at the 2018 New Zealand census, an increase of 279 people (3.7%) since the 2013 census, and an increase of 606 people (8.4%) since the 2006 census. There were 3,291 households. There were 3,963 males and 3,852 females, giving a sex ratio of 1.03 males per female. The median age was 46.4 years (compared with 37.4 years nationally), with 1,359 people (17.4%) aged under 15 years, 1,152 (14.7%) aged 15 to 29, 3,540 (45.3%) aged 30 to 64, and 1,770 (22.6%) aged 65 or older.

Ethnicities were 90.8% European/Pākehā, 7.3% Māori, 1.0% Pacific peoples, 5.0% Asian, and 1.9% other ethnicities. People may identify with more than one ethnicity.

The percentage of people born overseas was 14.9, compared with 27.1% nationally.

Although some people objected to giving their religion, 49.6% had no religion, 38.2% were Christian, 0.8% were Hindu, 0.1% were Muslim, 0.6% were Buddhist and 1.7% had other religions.

Of those at least 15 years old, 729 (11.3%) people had a bachelor or higher degree, and 1,749 (27.1%) people had no formal qualifications. The median income was $26,900, compared with $31,800 nationally. 726 people (11.2%) earned over $70,000 compared to 17.2% nationally. The employment status of those at least 15 was that 3,081 (47.7%) people were employed full-time, 966 (15.0%) were part-time, and 177 (2.7%) were unemployed.

 Urban areas and settlements 
Waimate, the district seat, is the only town in the district with a population over 1,000. It is home to  people, % of the district's population.

Other settlements and localities in the district include the following:

 Hakataramea-Waihaorunga Ward:
 Hakataramea Sub-Division: Cattle Creek
 Hakataramea
 Hakataramea Downs
 Hakataramea Valley
 Kinbrace Maungatiro Struan Te Akatarawa Waitangi Waihaorunga Sub-Division: DouglasWH
 Elephant HillWH
 IkawaiWH
 Kelceys BushWH
 Pentland Hills
 Waihao DownsWH
 Waihao ForksWH
 WaihaorungaWH
 ArnoDC
 KapuaDC
 KowhatuWH

 Lower Waihao Ward:
 Broad Gully
 Dog Kennel
 Glenavy
 Grays Corner
 Green Hills
 Gum Tree Flat
 Morven
 NukuroaDC
 Pikes Point StudholmeDC
 Tawai Waikakahi
 WillowbridgeDC

 Pareora-Otaio-Makikihi Ward:
 Blue Cliffs
 Esk Valley
 Gordons Valley
 Gunns Bush Hook
 Hook Bush Hunter
 Kohika
 Lyalldale
 Makikihi
 Maungati
 Otaio Gorge
 Otaio
 Saint Andrews
 Southburn
 Springbrook
 Waiariari
 Cup and Saucer Junction Riverview Waimate Ward:
 Deep CreekDC
 MaytownDC
 Norton ReserveDC
 UretaneDC
 Waimate
 WaitunaDC
 Te WaimateDC

 Notes: bold - main town; bold & italics - minor town; normal text - locality; italics'' - minor locality; DC - former populated place of defunct Deep Creek Ward; WH - former populated place of defunct Waihao Ward

References

External links 

Explore Waimate District
Waimate District Council

 
Districts of New Zealand